The China Welfare Institute (CWI) (中国福利会) was founded by Soong Ching Ling, Honorary President of the People's Republic of China and wife of Sun Yat-sen, in Hong Kong on June 14, 1938. It is one of the oldest and most influential NGOs nationwide in China.

CWI was originally named the China defense League (CDL). In December 1941, CDL was moved to Chongqing, and it fully rallied support for the War of Chinese People against Japanese Aggression. In November 1945, it was renamed the China Welfare Found (CWF) with its headquarters moved to Shanghai to support the great cause of liberation of the Chinese people. Meanwhile, it was active in promoting children welfare through cultural and educational programs. In August 1950, the name was changed to the China Welfare Institute (CWI), with its guidelines set to run experimental and demonstrative projects in women and children's health care and children's culture, education and welfare, enhance scientific researches, and continue international exchanges and cooperation.

Soong Ching Ling personally initiated many cultural, educational and healthcare institutions for women and children, including the CWI Children's Art Theatre, the CWI International Peace Maternity and Child Health Hospital, the CWI Children's Palace, the CWI Nursery, the CWI Kindergarten, the CWI Children's Epoch Publishing House, and the Children's Art Playhouse. This has made her a paragon of commitment to the welfare of children in China after 1949.

In the past 80 years, CWI has received great support and encouragement from many CPC and national government leaders, including Mao Zedong, Zhou Enlai, Zhu De, Liu Shaoqi, Deng Xiaoping, Jiang Zemin, Hu Jintao and Xi Jinping. CWI was successively chaired by Soong Ching Ling, Liao Chengzhi, Kang Keqing, Huang Hua, and Hu Qili, followed by Wang Jiarui who has taken over the office since 2017. All CWI chairmen or chairwomen are the Party and State Leaders of China. Its executive board consists of members from departments of the CPC Central Committee, ministries under the State Council, departments of the CPC Shanghai Committee and the municipal government, as well as other NGOs.

Currently, CWI runs many institutions specialized in areas of 1) maternal and child health, 2) school education, 3) out-of- school education, 3) children's play, 4) children's book publication, 5) senior citizen welfare, and 6) social welfare fund. Committed to the mandate of "being experimental and demonstrative" proposed by Soong Ching Ling and Premier Zhou Enlai, CWI has carried forward Soong's initiative to be fully dedicated to the welfare of women and children. Based in Shanghai with a vow of serving the whole nation and the world, it has made outstanding achievements in the process of institute development and has been widely recognized by the society. CWI has now become important organization working for the welfare of women and children.

External links
China Welfare Institute website (English)
China Welfare Institute website - Archive (English)

Social welfare charities
Medical and health organizations based in China
Education in China